The 2016 Basque regional election was held on Sunday, 25 September 2016, to elect the 11th Parliament of the Basque Autonomous Community. All 75 seats in the Parliament were up for election. The election was held simultaneously with a regional election in Galicia. Lehendakari Iñigo Urkullu announced that the election would be held one month ahead of schedule, on 25 September 2016, based on the "climate of ungovernability" affecting national politics as a result of the ongoing Spanish government formation negotiations, intending to move the regional election as far away as possible from a possible new general election. This prompted Galician president Alberto Núñez Feijóo to hold the Galician regional election in the same date.

Urkullu's Basque Nationalist Party (PNV) emerged as the largest political force in the region with an increased plurality, but required from the support of other parties to govern. This was to be provided by the Socialist Party of the Basque Country–Basque Country Left (PSE–EE), which despite scoring the worst result in its history after seeing its support almost halved—falling from 18.9% and 16 seats to 11.9% and 9 seats—would go on to form a coalition minority government with the PNV. EH Bildu was able to hold onto second place, albeit with a reduced support by going down from 21 to 17 seats, whereas the Elkarrekin Podemos alliance scored third, but below campaign expectations. The People's Party (PP) continued on its long-term decline in the Basque Country, whereas Citizens (Cs) failed to win any seat.

Urkullu was able to get re-elected as lehendakari with the support of both his party and the PSE–EE. The resulting coalition recovered an alliance which both the PNV and the PSE had already formed between 1987 and 1998 in the Basque government, and which had already been extended to city councils and the Juntas Generales following the 2015 local and foral elections.

The results of the Basque and Galician elections, both of which saw very poor PSOE's performances after being overtaken by the Podemos-led alliances and polling at record-low levels of support, prompted dissenters within the party—led by Andalusian president Susana Díaz—to call for Pedro Sánchez's resignation as PSOE secretary-general. Sánchez's refusal to resign and his announcement of a party congress for later in the year—amid an ongoing government formation process and with the growing risk of a third general election in a row being held in Spain—led to an attempt from his critics to force his downfall, triggering a severe party crisis and a break down of party discipline which led to Sánchez's ousting on 1 October 2016, a divided PSOE abstaining in Mariano Rajoy's investiture on 29 October and a subsequent party leadership election in 2017 which would see Sánchez returning to his post of secretary-general and taking full control over the party.

Overview

Electoral system
The Basque Parliament was the devolved, unicameral legislature of the autonomous community of the Basque Country, having legislative power in regional matters as defined by the Spanish Constitution of 1978 and the regional Statute of Autonomy, as well as the ability to vote confidence in or withdraw it from a lehendakari.

Voting for the Parliament was on the basis of universal suffrage, which comprised all nationals over 18 years of age, registered in the Basque Country and in full enjoyment of their political rights. Additionally, Basques abroad were required to apply for voting before being permitted to vote, a system known as "begged" or expat vote. The 75 members of the Basque Parliament were elected using the D'Hondt method and a closed list proportional representation, with an electoral threshold of three percent of valid votes—which included blank ballots—being applied in each constituency. Seats were allocated to constituencies, corresponding to the provinces of Álava, Biscay and Gipuzkoa, being allocated a fixed number of 25 seats each to provide for an equal representation of the three provinces in parliament as required under the regional statute of autonomy. This meant that Álava was allocated the same number of seats as Biscay and Gipuzkoa, despite their populations being, as of 1 July 2016: 322,801, 1,134,041 and 708,288, respectively.

The use of the D'Hondt method might result in a higher effective threshold, depending on the district magnitude.

Election date
The term of the Basque Parliament expired four years after the date of its previous election, unless it was dissolved earlier. The election decree was required to be issued no later than the twenty-fifth day prior to the date of expiry of parliament and published on the following day in the Official Gazette of the Basque Country (BOPV), with election day taking place on the fifty-fourth day from publication. The previous election was held on 21 October 2012, which meant that the legislature's term would have expired on 21 October 2016. The election decree was required to be published in the BOPV no later than 27 September 2016, with the election taking place on the fifty-fourth day from publication, setting the latest possible election date for the Parliament on Sunday, 20 November 2016.

The lehendakari had the prerogative to dissolve the Basque Parliament at any given time and call a snap election, provided that no motion of no confidence was in process. In the event of an investiture process failing to elect a lehendakari within a sixty-day period from the Parliament re-assembly, the Parliament was to be dissolved and a fresh election called.

Background
The 2012 Basque regional election had resulted in a minority government of the Basque Nationalist Party (PNV) replacing Patxi López's Socialist Party of the Basque Country–Basque Country Left (PSE–EE) cabinet. After a harsh 2009–2012 legislature which had seen frequent clashing between both parties, the signing of an agreement in September 2013 between both the PNV and the PSE, under which the latter committed itself to support the 2014 budget in exchange for more social democrat fiscal policies, paved the way for the normalization of relations between the two parties. The agreement eventually led to the culmination of an ideological realignment within the PNV, whose economic stance had been swinging in the previous years towards social democracy in detriment of its traditional pro-liberal positions. Additionally, the PNV under Urkullu had abandoned the confrontational style of former lehendakari Juan José Ibarretxe as well as his sovereigntist plan, moving towards more moderate, pragmatic and big tent positions.

Following the 2015 local and foral elections, the PNV and the PSE signed a deal "for institutional stability", under which both parties agreed to support each other in Basque local councils and the Juntas Generales, with the compromise of extending such an agreement to the Basque government after the regional election scheduled for 2016. Concurrently, the emergence of Podemos following the 2014 European Parliament election was initially seen as a threat to the PNV's dominance in the region, after opinion polls pointed to a strong performance of the party in a prospective Basque Parliament election as well as coming out in first place regionally in the 2015 and 2016 general elections. The various elections held in the Basque Country between 2012 and 2016 showed a continued decline for both the PSE–EE and the People's Party (PP), whereas EH Bildu suffered from a perceived poor management in the city council of San Sebastián and the Gipuzkoa foral deputation and lost much of its power in the local and foral elections held on 24 May 2015.

In the lead up to the election, the national PSOE was beleaguered by an internal crisis over Pedro Sánchez's leadership as a result of the party having secured its worst electoral results since the Spanish transition to democracy in the 2015 and 2016 general elections, with Sánchez himself having announced an early party congress, to be held at some point following the Basque and Galician elections, in which he would be running for re-election. The PSOE branches in both regions were widely seen as being supportive of Sánchez, prompting dissenters to frame the elections as a test on Sánchez and of the broader political mood in Spain after nine months of political impasse over the government formation process.

Parliamentary composition
The Basque Parliament was officially dissolved on 2 August 2016, after the publication of the dissolution decree in the Official Gazette of the Basque Country. The table below shows the composition of the parliamentary groups in the chamber at the time of dissolution.

Parties and candidates
The electoral law allowed for parties and federations registered in the interior ministry, coalitions and groupings of electors to present lists of candidates. Parties and federations intending to form a coalition ahead of an election were required to inform the relevant Electoral Commission within ten days of the election call, whereas groupings of electors needed to secure the signature of at least one percent of the electorate in the constituencies for which they sought election, disallowing electors from signing for more than one list of candidates.

Below is a list of the main parties and electoral alliances which contested the election:

The Union, Progress and Democracy (UPyD) party, despite holding one seat in the Basque Parliament for two legislatures—2009 and 2012—and amid dismal opinion poll ratings, renounced to field candidates for the regional election.

On 1 March 2016, Sortu leader Arnaldo Otegi left the Logroño prison after serving his full prison sentence imposed for attempting to reorganize the banned Batasuna party. In addition to the prison sentence, Otegi had been disqualified from holding any public office until 2021. Despite this, on 24 May the EH Bildu coalition proclaimed him as its leading candidate for lehendakari, on grounds that the ruling did not specify what specific criminal charges affected his disqualification. The PNV and Podemos announced that they would not challenge his candidacy because they thought it should be up to the Basque citizens to decide whether Otegi deserved to be elected or not; the PSE–EE, meanwhile, said that it would not challenge him either because such a decision should be taken by justice courts. On the other hand, the PP, Citizens (C's) and UPyD announced that, following the publication of the electoral lists, they would challenge Otegi's candidacy.

On 24 August the provincial electoral commission of Gipuzkoa ruled that Otegi could not be a candidate in the lists of EH Bildu for being barred to stand for election as part of his sentence. The journalist Maddalen Iriarte, who was second in EH Bildu Gipuzkoa's list, went on to top the list as provided for in Article 65.2 of the Electoral Law of the Basque Country.

Party slogans

Opinion polls
The table below lists voting intention estimates in reverse chronological order, showing the most recent first and using the dates when the survey fieldwork was done, as opposed to the date of publication. Where the fieldwork dates are unknown, the date of publication is given instead. The highest percentage figure in each polling survey is displayed with its background shaded in the leading party's colour. If a tie ensues, this is applied to the figures with the highest percentages. The "Lead" column on the right shows the percentage-point difference between the parties with the highest percentages in a poll. When available, seat projections determined by the polling organisations are displayed below (or in place of) the percentages in a smaller font; 38 seats were required for an absolute majority in the Basque Parliament.

Results

Overall

Distribution by constituency

Aftermath

Notes

References
Opinion poll sources

Other

2016 in the Basque Country (autonomous community)
Basque Country
Regional elections in the Basque Country (autonomous community)
September 2016 events in Spain